The President's Daughter is a political thriller novel by former U.S. President Bill Clinton and novelist James Patterson published in June 2021. It is Clinton's second novel, after The President is Missing (2018).

Plot
U.S. President and former Navy Seal Matthew Keating monitors an American military operation from the White House Situation Room. The operation enters Libyan territory without permission to raid the base of Muslim extremist terrorist Asim Al-Asheed. The operation kills several terrorists as well as Al-Asheed's civilian wives and children, but Al-Asheed escapes. Against the advice of his staff, Keating decides to publicly admit to the operation and apologize for its failure. Al-Asheed learns of this and swears revenge on Keating.

Two years later, Keating has lost his re-election campaign and lives quietly in rural New Hampshire with his family. Al-Asheed has built up a new terrorist group and secured the aid of Jiang Lijun, an agent of China's Ministry of State Security. Lijun hates the U.S. because of his father's death in the 1999 U.S. bombing of the Chinese embassy in Belgrade. 

Al-Asheed's team infiltrates Keating's town and kidnaps Keating's daughter, Melanie, while she is hiking. The U.S. government, whose new president still harbours dislike for Keating, refuses to let Keating join the search for Melanie because he is no longer a military or government employee. Lijun's boss, Li Baodong, orders him to obtain Melanie so that China can gain prestige by returning her to the U.S. However, Lijun privately decides to let Al-Asheed keep Melanie. Lijun meets with Al-Asheed and offers him further support. Al-Asheed escapes an attack by U.S. police and flees the country with Melanie.

Al-Asheed releases a video in which he names his ransom demands for Melanie's release, but Keating does not believe Al-Asheed intends to let Melanie live. (This is confirmed by chapters from Al-Asheed's perspective.) Keating decides to take matters into his own hands. He flees his Secret Service guards and obtains the help of several friends in the American, Saudi and Israeli militaries and intelligence agencies. Keating's ad-hoc team eventually locates Al-Asheed's new Libyan compound.

Baodong informs Lijun that he recorded the meeting in which Lijun did not negotiate with Al-Asheed for Melanie. He threatens Lijun with blackmail if he does not secure Melanie. He also says that the Chinese embassy in Belgrade had a secret military installment underneath it, thus Lijun should not consider his father an innocent victim and should end his grudge against the U.S. Meanwhile, Melanie frustrates Al-Asheed with several escape attempts.

Lijun travels to Al-Asheed's compound and attempts to negotiate for Melanie's handover, but Al-Asheed kills his bodyguards and takes him prisoner. Hours later, Keating and his team secure military passage to Libya and attack the compound. In the ensuing battle, Melanie is rescued and Al-Asheed is killed. Lijun, with no other options for escape, travels back to the U.S. with Keating's team under the cover story of being an innocent civilian prisoner. Lijun then escapes into Chinese custody.

The U.S. government declines to charge Keating's team with any crimes. Baodong kills Lijun for his failures and to cover up China's involvement in the affair. Keating returns to New Hampshire, but vows to run for president again in the next election.

Reception 
In a review for the New York Times, the book is called silly, yet highly entertaining. In a more negative review, the Washington Post says that "Clinton has once again revealed such a naked fantasy version of himself that you almost feel embarrassed for the man." Kirkus Reviews comments that the plot is cliché and predictable, but calls it "undemanding entertainment".

References

2021 American novels
Novels by James Patterson
Books by Bill Clinton
Cultural depictions of presidents of the United States
Collaborative novels
Political thriller novels
Novels about terrorism
Little, Brown and Company books
Alfred A. Knopf books
Books written by presidents of the United States